A metadirectory system provides for the flow of data between one or more directory services and databases, in order to maintain synchronization of that data, and is an important part of identity management systems. The data being synchronized typically are collections of entries that contain user profiles and possibly authentication or policy information. Most metadirectory deployments synchronize data into at least one LDAP-based directory server, to ensure that LDAP-based applications such as single sign-on and portal servers have access to recent data, even if the data is mastered in a non-LDAP data source.

Metadirectory products support filtering and transformation of data in transit.

Most identity management suites from commercial vendors include a metadirectory product, or a user provisioning product.

See also 
 Virtual directory
 Identity correlation
 Microsoft Identity Integration Server
 NetIQ Identity Manager
 Critical Path Metadirectory

Directory services
Data management